Clarence, the Cross-Eyed Lion is a 1965 light comedy-adventure film, produced by Ivan Tors, Leonard B. Kaufman, and Harry Redmond Jr., directed by Andrew Marton, and starring Marshall Thompson and Betsy Drake. The film was shot at Soledad Canyon near Los Angeles, California, and in Miami, Florida. It became the basis for the television series Daktari.

Plot
Paula Tracey (Cheryl Miller), an adventurous and fearless girl, is the daughter of veterinarian Dr. Marsh Tracey (Marshall Thompson). Dr. Tracey is the director of East Africa's animal hospital and nature preserve. He fights to protect all African wildlife, while studying and caring for injured animals and endangered species. Paula and her father find Clarence, a wild African lion who is cross-eyed which makes hunting in the wild impossible, and they adopt him as a new member of their wildlife preserve. Clarence later saves the day when Julie Harper (Betsy Drake) and her research gorillas are threatened by animal poachers.

Additional Information
She may sound like Dian Fossey, portrayed by Sigourey Weaver in Gorillas in the Mist, but Fossey did not begin her work with gorillas until 1966 (also personally threatened by poachers). Clarence was cross-eyed in real life and lived at Africa USA near Los Angeles. He was so tame that he would purr when his back was rubbed. Ivan Tors had previously made the movie Flipper (1963 film), which also became a TV series. Betsy Drake had retired from acting 6 years previous, but agreed to play this one role before returning to retirement. Marshall Thompson was bitten for real during the scene in which he rescues a woman from a leopard; they left the scene in as filmed. No relation to the 1962 John Wayne film Hatari, also set in Africa but not a comedy.

Cast
 Marshall Thompson as Dr. Marsh Tracy
 Betsy Drake as Julie Harper
 Richard Haydn as Rupert Rowbotham
 Cheryl Miller as Paula Tracy
 Alan Caillou as Carter
 Rockne Tarkington as Juma
 Maurice Marsac as Gregory
 Robert DoQui as Sergeant
 Albert Amos as Husseini
 Dinny Powell as Dinny
 Mark Allen as Larson
 Laurence Conroy as Tourist 
 Allyson Daniell as Tourist's Wife
 Janee Michelle as Girl In Pit
 Naaman Brown 
 Napoleon Whiting as Villager
 Chester Jones as Old Man

Animals
 Clarence The Lion
 Doris The Chimpanzee
 Mary Lou The Python

Production
The film was followed by the CBS TV series Daktari (1966–1969), with  Marshall Thompson and Cheryl Miller reprising their film roles.

References

External links
 
 
 
 

1965 films
Films about animals
Films about lions
1960s action films
American adventure comedy films
Films set in Kenya
Metro-Goldwyn-Mayer films
Films directed by Andrew Marton
Films adapted into television shows
1960s English-language films
1960s American films